Coryphantha macromeris, the nipple beehive cactus, is a species of cactus in the United States and Mexico. In the Chihuhuan Desert, it is common and has a wide range. In the United States, it occurs naturally in Texas and New Mexico. It prefers to grown in the shade under other larger plants, growing in irregular clusters or mounds. In late summer, it blooms with purple or pink flowers and then bears green fruit.

Biochemistry 
The phenethylamine macromerine is present in the cactus.

References

macromeris
Flora of the Southwestern United States
Cacti of the United States
Cacti of Mexico
Flora of Mexico